The Last Supper is a VHS/DVD by heavy metal band Black Sabbath in their original line-up. It features the live shows they put on stage on their US tour in 1999. This video has received negative criticism by fans for having interview segments interrupt the live footage. These segments were conducted by Henry Rollins, of Black Flag and the Rollins Band.

Track listing

Personnel
Tony Iommi - guitar
Geezer Butler - bass guitar
Bill Ward - drums
Ozzy Osbourne - vocals
Geoff Nicholls - keyboard

Certifications

Black Sabbath video albums
1999 live albums
1999 video albums
Live video albums
Sony Records live albums